Karla Kirkegaard (born 1954) is the Violetta L. Horton Research Professor of genetics at the Stanford University School of Medicine. She was the chair of the Department of Microbiology and Immunology from 2006 to 2010. She is an elected member of the American Academy of Arts and Sciences and the National Academy of Sciences. Her research focuses on virology.

Education 
Kirkegaard received her bachelor's degree in genetics from the University of California Berkeley in 1976 and her PhD from Harvard University in biochemistry and molecular biology in 1983 the lab of James C. Wang. She then did postdoctoral research at the Whitehead Institute in the lab of David Baltimore.

Career 
She joined the faculty at the University of Colorado Boulder, before moving to the Stanford University School of Medicine in 1996. She was the chair of the Department of Microbiology and Immunology from 2006 to 2010.

She is an editor for the American Society for Microbiology's Journal of Virology. She was a Howard Hughes Medical Institute investigator and her work has been funded by the Michael J. Fox Foundation. 

Her research focuses on the transmission of viruses and how viruses develop resistance to drugs.

Awards 
 1987 Searle Scholar
 1989 Packard Fellow
 2006 NIH Director's Pioneer Award
 2010 Elected fellow of the American Association for the Advancement of Science
 2012 Elected fellow of the American Academy of Microbiology
 Elected fellow of the American Academy of Arts and Sciences
 2019 Elected fellow of the National Academy of Sciences

References 

Howard Hughes Medical Investigators
American virologists
Stanford University School of Medicine faculty
Harvard University alumni
University of California, Berkeley alumni
Fellows of the American Association for the Advancement of Science
Fellows of the American Academy of Arts and Sciences
Members of the United States National Academy of Sciences
1954 births
Living people